Shelby Lindley  is an American actress who has provided voices for the English dubs of Japanese anime and video games. Her major voice roles include Tsumugi Kotobuki in K-On!, Chizuru Aizawa in Squid Girl and Hitomi Shizuki in Puella Magi Madoka Magica.

Filmography
BOLD indicates a lead role

Anime

Animation

Film

Video games

References

External links
  
 
 

Living people
American video game actresses
American voice actresses
Place of birth missing (living people)
Year of birth missing (living people)
21st-century American women